Betsy Wolfe (born Elizabeth Marie Wolfe; June 1, 1982) is an American actress, singer, and entrepreneur.

Betsy Wolfe is currently starring in the new Broadway musical & Juliet as Anne. Previously, Wolfe starred as Jenna Hunterson, the title role in the Tony Awards nominated musical Waitress. Prior to that she played Cordelia, one of the lovable "lesbians from next door" in the Broadway revival of Falsettos, and Rosa Bud in The Mystery of Edwin Drood. She is best known for her critically acclaimed performance as Cathy Hiatt in the Off-Broadway revival of The Last Five Years.

In 2020, Wolfe starred in the holiday film Estella Scrooge: A Christmas Carol With A Twist. She can be seen in the indie feature First One In, and had a guest starring role on the CBS series Instinct.

Wolfe co-founded BroadwayEvolved, a musical theatre training program for students.

Early life and education
Wolfe grew up in Visalia, California. She attended Golden West High School and graduated in 2000. She graduated from the University of Cincinnati – College-Conservatory of Music in 2004.

Career
Wolfe played Evelyn Nesbit in the Paper Mill Playhouse production of Ragtime in 2005.

Wolfe starred as Cathy in the Off-Broadway revival of The Last Five Years, which ran at the Second Stage Theater from March 7, 2013 (previews), to May 18, 2013. Charles Isherwood, in his review in The New York Times, wrote that Wolfe has "a bright, strong soprano with a keen belt. With her wholesome blond beauty she is well cast."

In 2014 she appeared on Broadway in Woody Allen's musical Bullets Over Broadway as Ellen. The CurtainUp reviewer wrote: "Betsy Wolfe also has little to do as David's girlfriend Ellen but, like Ziemba, when she does get to sing it's lovely."

She appeared in Up Here, a new musical written by Robert Lopez and Kristen Anderson-Lopez, at the La Jolla Playhouse in July 2015. The Variety reviewer noted that Wolfe "is charming in her role and even sings the hell out of such banalities as 'I feel like I've always known you.'"

In May 2016, Wolfe played Elsa in the lab production of Disney's Frozen.

She appeared in a reading of a new musical titled Flying Over Sunset by James Lapine (book and director), Tom Kitt (score) and Michael Korie (lyrics). The reading took place at the Vineyard Arts Project in Edgartown, Massachusetts, on July 29, 2016, with additional cast members Marin Mazzie and Boyd Gaines.

Wolfe played Cordelia in the Broadway revival of Falsettos, which ran from September 29, 2016 (previews), to January 8, 2017. She joined the cast of Waitress on Broadway on June 13, 2017, in the role of Jenna. Wolfe left the role on January 9, 2018.

In February 2018, Wolfe and Cynthia Rose announced that they would be founding a company, BroadwayEvolved, to give workshops and masterclasses to young actors.

In June 2018, she played Rosemary Pilkington for a limited engagement of How to Succeed in Business Without Really Trying at the Kennedy Center in Washington, D.C., alongside Michael Urie, John Bolton, John Michael Higgins and Skylar Astin.

In 2020, Wolfe appeared as Bonnie in the musical podcast Propaganda!

She is currently starring as Anne in the new Broadway musical & Juliet at the Stephen Sondheim Theatre.

Opera and concerts
Wolfe appeared with the Cincinnati Pops Orchestra, directed by Erich Kunzel, at Carnegie Hall on April 1, 2003. In 2016 and 2017, Wolfe appeared with Darren Criss and Adam Kantor, respectively, in The New York Pops' concerts "Best of Broadway" and "Women of Notes: In Dedication to Female Composers and Lyricists" at Carnegie Hall, with appearances by Robert Lopez, Kristen Anderson-Lopez, and Jason Robert Brown, and by Sara Bareilles, Ingrid Michaelson, Georgia Stitt, and Shaina Taub, respectively. She also frequently performs the music of newer musical theatre writers in concert, including Ryan Scott Oliver and Zack Zadek.

Wolfe appeared in the Metropolitan Opera production of Die Fledermaus as Ida, with a new book by Douglas Carter Beane. The opera, which also starred Paulo Szot as Dr. Falke and Danny Burstein as Frosch, opened on December 31, 2013.
In November 2017 Wolfe performed at the Houston symphony with Jeremy Jordan.

Personal life
Wolfe began dating Adam Krauthamer, a French horn player, in June 2014. They met while working on Bullets Over Broadway. The pair married on December 17, 2017. In May 2020, Wolfe and Krauthamer welcomed a daughter, Poppy.

Theater credits

Sources:

Filmography

Film

Television

Source:

Discography
 2007: 110 in the Shade (2007 New Broadway Cast Recording)
 2009: Everyday Rapture (Original Cast Recording)
 2011: Stage Door Canteen: Broadway Responds to WWII (Original Concert Cast Recording)
 2012: 35mm: A Musical Exhibition (Original Cast Recording)
 2012: Merrily We Roll Along (2012 New Encores! Cast Recording)
 2012: The Mystery Of Edwin Drood (2012 New Broadway Cast Recording)
 2012: "Bustle Fluffah"single (with Andy Karl and Jessie Mueller)
 2013: The Last Five Years (2013 New Cast Recording)
 2013: Crosses: A Musical of Hope (Original Studio Cast Recording)
 2014: Bullets Over Broadway (Original Broadway Cast Recording)
 2016: Falsettos (2016 New Broadway Cast Recording)
 2019: A Never Ending Line (Original Studio Cast Recording)
 2020: Estella Scrooge (2020 Soundtrack)
 2021: Some Lovers (2021 Concept Recording)
 2022: “& Juliet” (Original Broadway Cast Recording) 

Source:

References

External links

1982 births
Living people
American musical theatre actresses
American sopranos
American stage actresses
21st-century American actresses
People from Visalia, California
University of Cincinnati – College-Conservatory of Music alumni